Perifollicular fibroma is a cutaneous condition, a benign tumor usually skin colored, most often affecting the face and upper trunk.

See also 
 Birt–Hogg–Dubé syndrome
 List of skin conditions

References 

Epidermal nevi, neoplasms, and cysts